Harmonium is a composition for chorus and orchestra by the American composer John Adams, written in 1980-1981 for the first season of Davies Symphony Hall in San Francisco, California. The work is based on poetry by John Donne and Emily Dickinson and is regarded as one of the key compositions of Adams' "minimalist" period.

The work was premiered by the San Francisco Symphony and San Francisco Symphony Chorus, with conductor Edo de Waart, on 15 April 1981, and subsequently recorded it. The UK premiere was on 13 October 1987 at Birmingham Town Hall, with the City of Birmingham Symphony Orchestra (CBSO) conducted by Simon Rattle. Rattle and the CBSO gave the London premiere on 28 July 1990 at The Proms.

Music 

Each movement is a setting of an entire poem:
 

"Because I could not stop for Death" ends with an orchestral interlude that segues into "Wild Nights" without a pause. A typical performance takes about 35 minutes.

Timothy Johnson has discussed various aspects of the harmonic language of Harmonium in detail. K. Robert Schwarz has noted the influence of the musical techniques of Steve Reich on Harmonium, and also has commented on the less schematic and more "intuitive" manner of Adams' composition in the work.

"Negative Love" is featured in the film Superstar: The Life and Times of Andy Warhol (1990).

Instrumentation

Chorus
soprano, alto, tenor, bass; minimum of 90 performers

Woodwinds
4 flutes (2nd, 3rd, and 4th doubling on piccolo)
3 oboes
3 clarinets in B (1st and 2nd doubling clarinet in A, 3rd doubling bass clarinet)
3 bassoons (3rd doubling contrabassoon)

Brass
4 horns in F
4 trumpets in C (1st doubling B and D trumpets; 2nd, 3rd, and 4th doubling B trumpet)
3 trombones
tuba

Timpani and Percussion, 4 players
2 marimbas
metallophone
xylophone
tubular bells
crotales
glockenspiel
suspended cymbal
sizzle cymbal
crash cymbals
triangle
bass drum
tom-toms, medium and large
anvil
cowbells
tambourine

Keyboards

piano (or synthesizer)
celesta

Strings
harp
violins
violas
cellos
double basses
|}

Recordings
 ECM New Series 1277: San Francisco Symphony Chorus; San Francisco Symphony; Edo de Waart, conductor
 Telarc CD-80365: Atlanta Symphony Chorus; Atlanta Symphony Orchestra; Robert Shaw, conductor
 Nonesuch 79549: San Francisco Symphony Chorus; San Francisco Symphony; John Adams, conductor

References

Bibliography
 Steinberg, Michael, Choral Masterworks (Oxford and New York: Oxford University Press, 2005). ISBN to come.

External links
 John Adams homepage, entry on Harmonium
 RadioM, Morning Concert, John Adams: Harmonium (October 30, 1981)

Compositions by John Adams (composer)
Choral compositions
1981 compositions